This is a list of events and openings related to amusement parks that occurred in 2013. These various lists are not exhaustive.

Amusement parks

Opening

 India Adlabs Imagica – April 18
 United States Aquatica San Diego – Spring, to replace the former Knott's Soak City water park
 People's Republic of China  Euro Park – August 11
 People's Republic of China Fantawild Dream Park – April 28
 Floraland Continent Park
 Hainan Wenchang Space Theme Park
 Happy Kingdom
 People's Republic of China Happy Valley, Tianjin – July 27
 United Arab Emirates IMG Theme Park
 Indonesia JungLeLand 
 Jurassic Dream
 Lanzhou Hengda Chinese Ecological Park
 Nantong Adventure Land
 People's Republic of China Ocean Kingdom
 People's Republic of China Qihe Happy World 
 People's Republic of China Sino Wonderland
 Philippines Sky Fun Amusement Park – March 2
 Turkey Vialand
 United States Wet'n'Wild Las Vegas – May
 Australia Wet'n'Wild Sydney – December 12
 United Arab Emirates Yas Waterworld – January 24

Change of ownership
 Knott's Soak City (Palm Springs) – Cedar Fair Entertainment Company » CNL Lifestyle Properties

Birthday

 United States Aquatica Florida – 5th birthday
 Netherlands Attractiepark Slagharen – 50th birthday
 United States Carowinds – 40th birthday
 United States Disney's Animal Kingdom – 15th birthday
 United States Frontier City – 55th birthday
 Sweden Gröna Lund – 130th birthday
 Germany Heide Park – 35th birthday
 Denmark Legoland Billund – 45th birthday
 England Paultons Park – 30th birthday
 United States SeaWorld San Antonio – 25th birthday
 United States SeaWorld Orlando – 40th birthday
 United States Six Flags America – 40th birthday
 United States Six Flags Discovery Kingdom – 45th birthday
 United States Soak City (Sandusky, Ohio) – 25th birthday
 United States Soak City (Valleyfair) – 30th birthday
 United States Splash Adventure – 15th birthday
 Japan Tokyo Disneyland – 30th birthday
 United States Worlds of Fun – 40th birthday

Closed
 King Richard's Park – April 14
 Genting Theme Park – August 31

Additions

Roller coasters

New

Relocated

Refurbished

Other attractions

New

Closed attractions & roller coasters

Amusement parks in terms of attendance

Worldwide
This section list the top 25 largest amusement parks worldwide in order of annual attendance in 2013.

Poll rankings

Golden Ticket Awards

The Amusement Today Golden Ticket Awards were held at Santa Cruz Beach Boardwalk in Santa Cruz, California.

Best Roller Coaster Poll
Mitch Hawker's Best Roller Coaster Poll were held in early 2014 for the previous year.

Records broken

See also
 List of roller coaster rankings
 :Category:Amusement rides introduced in 2013
 :Category:Roller coasters introduced in 2013
 :Category:Amusement rides that closed in 2013

Notes

References

External links
 Listing of 2013 roller coaster openings at the Roller Coaster DataBase
 Listing of 2013 roller coaster closures at the Roller Coaster DataBase

Amusement parks by year
Amusement parks